Paul de Plument de Bailhac (1 August 1864 – 6 July 1951) was a French painter. His work was part of the painting event in the art competition at the 1924 Summer Olympics.

References

1864 births
1951 deaths
19th-century French male artists
19th-century French painters
20th-century French painters
20th-century French male artists
French male painters
Olympic competitors in art competitions
People from Seine-Saint-Denis